Thomas Hoby was an English diplomat and translator.

Thomas Hoby may also refer to:

Thomas Posthumous Hoby (1566–1640), English Puritan and politician
Thomas Hoby (died 1706) (1642–1706), MP for Great Marlow and Salisbury
Sir Thomas Hoby, 3rd Baronet (1685–1730) of the Hoby baronets
Sir Thomas Hoby, 4th Baronet (died 1744), MP for Great Marlow

See also
Hoby (disambiguation)